Lacrosse has its origins in a tribal game played by eastern Woodlands Native Americans and by some Plains Indians tribes in what is now the United States of America and Canada. The game was extensively modified by European settlers to create its current collegiate and professional form. There were hundreds of native men playing a ball game with sticks. The game began with the ball being tossed into the air and the two sides rushing to catch it. Because of the large number of players involved, these games generally tended to involve a huge mob of players swarming the ball and slowly moving across the field. Passing the ball was thought of as a trick, and it was seen as cowardly to dodge an opponent. Years later lacrosse is still a popular sport played all over the world.

Indigenous North American game

 
Modern day lacrosse descends from and resembles games played by various Native American communities. These include games called dehontsigwaehs in Oee ("they bump hips"), Tewaaraton in Mohawk language ("little brother of war"), baaga`adowe in Ojibwe ("bump hips") and kabucha in Choctaw.

Lacrosse is one of the oldest team sports in North America. There is evidence that a version of lacrosse originated in what is now Canada as early as the 17th century. Native American lacrosse was played throughout modern Canada, but was most popular around the Great Lakes, Mid-Atlantic seaboard, and American South.

Traditional lacrosse games were sometimes semi-major events that could last several days. As many as 100 to 1,000 men from opposing villages or tribes would participate.

Rules for these games were decided on the day before. Generally, there was no out-of-bounds, and the ball could not be touched with the hands. The goals would be selected as large rocks or trees; in later years wooden posts were used. Playing time was often from sunup until sundown.

In the Southeastern two-stick version there were traditionally three areas of scoring on the stickball pole. There would be a mark, about chest high on the pole, which, when the ball hit above this mark, would award one point. Contact below that point was not scored. The top half of the pole, well above arms' reach, was usually worth two points when hit. The very top of the pole, usually embellished with a large figure of a fish or other sacred animal, was worth three points. In recreational games, scoring was loosely kept, most times by the audience or a few players. Games typically would reach around twenty points before concluding. The Iroquois and Great Lakes styles would use poles or goal posts. 

The game began with the ball being tossed into the air and the two sides rushing to catch it. Because of the large number of players involved, these games generally tended to involve a huge mob of players swarming the ball and slowly moving across the field. Passing the ball was thought of as a trick, and it was seen as cowardly to dodge an opponent.

The medicine men acted as coaches, and the women of the tribe would usually tend to players and cheer them on as well as sang while the men played. There was also a women's version of lacrosse called amtahcha in some areas, which used much shorter sticks with larger heads. Another version that women played instead amongst the Iroquois and Eastern Woodland area was double ball.

Lacrosse traditionally had many different purposes. Some games were played to settle inter-tribal disputes. This function was essential to keeping the Six Nations of the Iroquois together. Lacrosse was also played to toughen young warriors for combat, for recreation, as part of festivals, and for the bets involved. Finally, lacrosse was played for religious reasons: "for the pleasure of the Creator," and to collectively pray for something.

Rituals

Pregame rituals were very similar to rituals associated with war. Players would decorate their bodies with paint and charcoal. Players also decorated their sticks or stick racks with objects representing qualities desired in the game. Strict taboos were held on what players could eat before a game, and the medicine man performed rituals to prepare players and their sticks. The night before a game, players wore ceremonial regalia and held a special dance. Sacrifices were held, and sacred expressions were yelled to intimidate opponents.

On the day of the game, teams walked to the field and were slowed by constant rituals. One ceremony was "going to water", in which players dunked their sticks in water and the shaman gave a spiritual and strategic pep talk. Sometimes players would receive ceremonial scratches on their arms or torso.

Before the game, every player was required to place a wager. Items such as handkerchiefs, knives, trinkets and horses were part of the wager. The bets would be displayed on a rack near the spectators, and items would be awarded proportionally to the winner of each quarter.

When the game was over ceremonial dance took place, along with a large feast for the hungry players.

Equipment

Some early lacrosse balls were fashioned out of wood. Others were made of deerskin stuffed with hair. They were typically three inches in diameter.

The first lacrosse sticks were essentially giant wooden spoons with no netting. Great Lakes style sticks had one end bent into a 4 to  diameter circle, which was filled with netting. This netting was made of wattup or deer sinew. The Iroquois and Eastern Woodland style sticks use a U-shape instead of a circle.

Lacrosse sticks often had elaborate carvings on them intended to help players in the game. Lacrosse sticks were so treasured that many players requested to be buried with their stick beside them upon death.

Some versions of lacrosse used unusual stick designs. In the St. Lawrence Valley a version was played in which the head took up two thirds of the stick. In the Southwestern United States a double-stick version was played with sticks about two and a half feet long.

No protective equipment was worn in traditional lacrosse.

European involvement

The first westerners to encounter lacrosse were French Jesuit missionaries in the St. Lawrence Valley. During the 1630s, they witnessed the game and condemned it. They were opposed to lacrosse because it was violent, betting was involved, and it was part of the religion they sought to eradicate.

One missionary, Jean de Brébeuf, was the first to write about lacrosse and thus gave it its name. He described the Hurons in present-day Ontario playing "crosse" in 1637. Some say the name originated from the French term for field hockey, le jeu de la crosse.

Despite Jesuit opposition, many other European colonists were intrigued by lacrosse. Betting on games became common, and around 1740 many French colonists were taking up the game. However, it is widely believed they could not match the skill of the Native Americans.

James Smith described in some detail a game being played in 1757 by his fellow tribe members "wherein they used a wooden ball, about three inches diameter, and the instrument they moved it with was a strong staff about five feet long, with a hoop net on the end of it, large enough to contain the ball."

In 1763, Ojibwas used a lacrosse game to capture Fort Michilimackinac (now Mackinaw City, Michigan). Natives invited the fort's British troops to watch a lacrosse game. The players gradually worked their way close to the gates, and then rushed into the fort and carried out a general massacre.

In 1805 during an expedition up the Mississippi River, U.S. army officer Lt. Zebulon Pike observed a group of young Ho-Chunk (also known as Winnebago) and Sioux men playing this game, or one resembling it, near the east bank of the river, in what is now west-central Wisconsin. He named the region "Prairie de la Crosse", which in turn inspired the name of both the Wisconsin county and its principal city. Today, two statues in the city of La Crosse commemorate the game observed by Pike.

In 1834 a team of Caughnawaga Indians demonstrated lacrosse in Montreal. Although response to the demonstrations was not overwhelming, interest in lacrosse steadily grew in Canada.

In 1856, William George Beers, a Canadian dentist, founded Montreal Lacrosse Club. He codified the game in 1867 to shorten the length of each game, reduce the number of players, use a redesigned stick, and use a rubber ball. The first game played under Beers' rules was at Upper Canada College in 1867. During the 1860s lacrosse became Canada's national summer game. The first overseas exhibition games were played in 1867. In 1876, Queen Victoria witnessed an exhibition game and was impressed, saying "The game is very pretty to watch." Her endorsement was enough for many English girls' schools to adopt the sport in the 1890s. The Mohawk Lacrosse Club in Troy, New York became the first organized club in the United States.

As lacrosse grew, opposition to its violent aspects was a major obstacle. The game was banned in some areas when, in 1900, Choctaw Indians attached lead weights to their sticks to use them as skull-crackers.

By the 20th century, many high schools, colleges and universities had adopted lacrosse as a league sport. Lacrosse became an Olympic sport for the 1904 and 1908 Summer Olympics, but was then dropped as an official sport. After 1908, lacrosse was a sport in the World Games.

In the 1930s, an indoor version of the game, box lacrosse, was introduced in Canada. It quickly became the dominant form of the sport in Canada, in part due to the severe winter weather that limited outdoor play.

Minor leagues developed for box lacrosse and college lacrosse. Two professional leagues also were created: In 1987 the Eagle Pro Box Lacrosse League was founded; it eventually became the Major Indoor Lacrosse League, and then the National Lacrosse League (NLL). In the summer of 2001, a professional field lacrosse league, known as Major League Lacrosse (MLL), was inaugurated. In 2019, the Premier Lacrosse League was created, which offered higher wages and better benefits for the players.

Lacrosse today
Today lacrosse is mostly popular in Canada and the United States but also has participation in the United Kingdom and Australia. Though Lacrosse is not as popular as many other sports, participation and interest is growing. US Lacrosse has reported that kids in America are opting to try a different sport from what they usually have chosen. US Lacrosse survey shows that, boys and girls lacrosse has grown by 47% and 43.1%. Also, the NCAA reported a 24% increase in the number of new men’s lacrosse programs created in the last two decades and women’s athletic department saw a 65% increase in the number of new programs created between 1998-2008. With the youth movement of lacrosse participation this will lead to more high school lacrosse players, then lead to more college lacrosse players, then more professional players and ultimately more interest in the sport. 

Although lacrosse has seen a 35% surge in participation since 2012, attendance at MLL (Major League Lacrosse) games have decreased and the sport doesn't get the television coverage like other sports in the US do. Paul Rabil, arguably the greatest and most influential lacrosse player of all time, tried to purchase the MLL on several occasions after being tired of poor wages and low attendance at games, but was denied by the MLL. Paul Rabil with his brother, Mike Rabil, would go to create their own lacrosse league known as the PLL (Premier Lacrosse League) in 2018. They received financial support from the Chernin Group, which owns Barstool Sports, and Alibaba co-founder Joseph Tsai. The brothers also signed a contract with NBC, and NBC Sports to broadcast the league games. The PLL offers a $25,000 minimum salary, which was three times more than what MLL players made, plus health-care benefits and equity in the league. The PLL has allowed many professional players to make lacrosse their full-time job, which is why many MLL players are migrating to the PLL, and why many college lacrosse players have chosen the PLL over the MLL and other professional leagues. With the creation of the PLL there was an increase in attendance. In 2019, the PLL's first season, there were over 10,000 attendees at every weekend event and hundreds of thousands watching from home. With proper financial backing, marketing, television broadcasting and distribution, the PLL had a successful first season that saw more viewership and interest than the MLL. It was a historic success. 

After two seasons, the MLL was merged into the more successful PLL in 2021, making the latter the sole men's pro field lacrosse league in North America.

In 2021, Athletes Unlimited Lacrosse, the field lacrosse wing of the growing pro women's sports league in the US, began operations.

See also
 Mesoamerican ballgame
List of the oldest lacrosse teams
 Native American stickball

References

Further reading 

 
 
 
 Downey, Allan. The creator’s game: Lacrosse, identity, and Indigenous nationhood (UBC Press, 2018).
 
 
 Fisher, Donald M. Lacrosse: A history of the game (JHU Press, 2002).
 
 

 Stoikos, Alex. A Journalistic Overview of Lacrosse in the Western World"   Academia Letters, (2021) Article 1591. https://doi.org/10.20935/AL1591 

 
 Wiser, Melissa C. "Lacrosse History, a History of One Sport or Two? A Comparative Analysis of Men's Lacrosse and Women's Lacrosse in the United States." International Journal of the History of Sport'' 31.13 (2014): 1656-1676.

External links 
 Onondaga: The Lacrosse Stick Makers

Historical Lacrosse Stick and Equipment Database

Lacrosse
Lacrosse